Serhiy Cherniy is a Ukrainian retired footballer.

Career
Serhiy Cherniy started his career in 2000 with  Dynamo-3 Kyiv until 2002 where he played 24 matches. In summer 2002 he played 13 matches with Borysfen-2 Boryspil. In the season 2003–2004 he moved to Borysfen Boryspil, where he played 13 matches. In 2003 he played 14 matches and scored 1 goal with Borysfen-2 Boryspil. In 2004 until 2006 he played 61 matches with Borysfen Boryspil. In summer 2006 he moved to Desna Chernihiv, the main club of the city of Chernihiv, where he played 13 games. In the winter transfer he returned to Borysfen Boryspil where he played 17 matches and in 2008 he played 1 match with Stal-2 Alchevsk.

References

External links 
 Serhiy Cherniy at footballfacts.ru
 Serhiy Cherniy at allplayers.in.ua

1984 births
Living people
FC Desna Chernihiv players
FC Dynamo-3 Kyiv players
FC Borysfen Boryspil players
FC Borysfen-2 Boryspil players
FC Stal-2 Alchevsk players
Ukrainian footballers
Ukrainian Premier League players
Ukrainian First League players
Ukrainian Second League players
Association football defenders